Maxime Hérold (born 9 September 1989) is a French professional rugby league footballer who plays as a  or  for the Limoux Grizzlies in the Elite One Championship. He is a France international.

Playing career
In 2014 he signed for the London Broncos in the Super League, after an initial four-week trial.

In 2014 Hérold returned to France and re-joined Limoux Grizzlies in the Elite Championship.

He made his France début in 2015 against Serbia.

References

External links

Limoux Grizzlies profile
France profile
2017 RLWC profile

Living people
1989 births
Rugby league props
Rugby league second-rows
London Broncos players
Limoux Grizzlies players
French rugby league players
France national rugby league team players